1882 East Macquarie colonial by-election may refer to 

 1882 East Macquarie colonial by-election 1 held on 19 January 1882
 1882 East Macquarie colonial by-election 2 held on 11 July 1882

See also
 List of New South Wales state by-elections